Jaymay In Norway is the 2014 album by American singer-songwriter Jaymay, recorded entirely at Spinner-Studio in Halden, Norway

Track listing
All songs written by Jaymay
 "Orange Peels" - 3:41
 "I Was Only Lovin' You" - 2:54
 "Necklace I" - 1:11
 "To Tell The Truth" - 4:01
 "Letter" - 2:21
 "Cassie's Song" - 3:34
 "Necklace II" - 3:16
 "Pins & Needles (feat. Vidar Busk)" - 2:47
 "We Say Goodbye (Norway)" - 2:03

Personnel

Musicians
Jaymay - Musician and vocals
Philip Mohn - Musician and vocals
Tomas Pettersen - Musician
Terje Støldal - Musician
Vidar Busk - Musician and vocals
Ole Amundsen - Musician and vocals
Sverre Dæhli - Vocals
Håvard Dahle - Vocals

Production
Philip Mohn - Producer 
Tomas Pettersen - Co-Producer
Philip Mohn - Mixing
Tomas Pettersen - Mixing
Sverre Dæhli - Mastering
Geir Foshaug - Photography

References

2014 albums
Jaymay albums